The 12343 / 12344  Sealdah-Haldibari-Sealdah Darjeeling Mail is one of the oldest running legendary trains in India that has been running from pre-independence days and is still in operation. It connects to the Darjeeling Himalayan Railway at New Jalpaiguri. This is a major train for Kolkata–New Jalpaiguri route. It is also the first train to run with AC electric loco WAP-7 in Sealdah to New-Jalpaiguri stretch.

History

Run via East Bengal
During the British period all connections to North Bengal were through East Bengal.

From 1878, the railway route from Kolkata, then called Calcutta, to Siliguri was in two laps. The passengers would then avail a ferry across the river. The second lap of the journey was a  metre-gauge line of the North Bengal Railway that linked Saraghat on the northern bank of the Padma to Siliguri.

In 1916 the metre-gauge section north of the bridge was converted to broad gauge, and so the entire Calcutta – Siliguri route became broad-gauge. The route thus roughly ran: Sealdah–Ranaghat–Bheramara–Hardinge Bridge–Iswardi–Santahar––Parabtipur–Nilphamari–Haldibari–Jalpaiguri–Siliguri.

The Darjeeling Mail ran on this route in pre-partition days. Even after the partition of India it ran on this route for some years.

Ferry across Ganges (Post-partition)
With the partition of India in 1947, the major hurdle in connecting Kolkata and Siliguri was that there was no bridge across the Ganges in West Bengal or Bihar. In 1949 Kishanganj–Siliguri section too was converted to metre gauge, thus making the entire route a uni-gauge one.

Run via Farakka Barrage
In the early 1965s, when Farakka Barrage was being constructed, a more radical change was made. Indian Railways created a new broad-gauge rail link from Kolkata, and on a greenfield site south of Siliguri Town built an entirely new broad-gauge junction, .

Since then Darjeeling Mail has been using the Howrah–New Jalpaiguri line.

Coach composition 
This train has 22 LHB coach
Sealdah to Haldibari

Haldibari to Sealdah

See also
Sealdah railway station
Haldibari railway station
Darjeeling Himalayan Railway

References

External links

    Railway Website

|

Transport in Kolkata
Rail transport in West Bengal
Transport in Siliguri
Transport in Jalpaiguri
Mail trains in India